The Real Escuela Superior de Arte Dramático (RESAD) is a drama school in Madrid, Spain.

History 
It traces its origins back to the foundation of the Escuela de Declamación Española in May 1831. The 1857  conferred the status of higher studies to the studies in the school.

The RESAD opened its premises in the Niño Jesús neighborhood in Madrid, next to El Retiro, in October 1996.
The RESAD offers three specialisations: 'Stage Direction & Dramaturgy' (dirección escénica y dramaturgia), 'Scenography Design' (escenografía), and 'Acting' (interpretación).

References 

Schools of the performing arts
Schools in Madrid
Performing arts in Spain
Educational institutions established in 1831
Drama schools in Spain